Pennalithus is a genus of Phrurolithidae spiders, first described by Takahide Kamura in 2021. It contains four species; P. palgongensis, P. pennatus, P. splendidus and P. suguroi, distributed in east Asia.

References 

Phrurolithidae genera
Spiders of Asia
Phrurolithidae